Turkmenistan competed at the 2000 Summer Paralympics in Sydney, Australia. 1 competitor from Turkmenistan won no medals to finish joint 69th in the medal table along with all other countries who failed to win medals.

See also 
 Turkmenistan at the Paralympics
 Turkmenistan at the 2000 Summer Olympics

References 

Turkmenistan at the Paralympics
2000 in Turkmenistani sport
Nations at the 2000 Summer Paralympics